Norske Løve is the name of a 19th-century fortress built from 1852 to 1859 to protect Karljohansvern naval station at Horten in Norway.

Overview
Norske Løve (literally, 'Norwegian Lion') is a reference to the lion on the Coat of Arms of Norway. The fort is still a military area, but is today only used as an administration building for the Norwegian naval officers training school.

The fort was constructed by Baltazar Nicolai Garben. The primary construction material was limestone, reinforced with granite.  The fortress structure was fitted with heavy artillery on several floors protected by casemates. It has a moat which can be filled with water and was originally fitted with a circular envelope with 22 open casemates each holding a 3-ton cannon. The fort originally had a complement of 500 men. The open casemates were walled up by the Germans during World War II, but otherwise the fort is largely in its original form.

Picture Gallery

See also
Citadellet

References

External links 
 Norwegian Directorate for Cultural Heritage site with an image of the gate
 Norwegian navy page with an image of the fort at the bottom.

Forts in Norway
Royal Norwegian Navy
Military installations in Vestfold og Telemark
1852 establishments in Norway
Horten